Bee Gul is a Pakistani screenwriter and director. She wrote Films and TV plays like Talkhiyaan, Pehchaan, Kaun Qamar Ara, Firdous ki Dozakh, most notably Dar Si Jaati Hai Sila and Raqeeb Se for HUM TV.

Bee Gul's stories often deal with themes of Reality & Identity. Hypocrisy is the underlying theme, involving bitter love & conservative values. Her work is often described as Artsy. She has written women-centric plays that threw light upon social issues, especially those concerning Asian or Pakistani Women, that portrayed the power of a gutsy woman.
Her film Intezaar (2022) is out now in Pakistani Cinemas nationwide.

TV series
Ain was a series made up of stories which explore all the various relationships that we go through in life; be they with people, with a special place, with God and religion or those of the spiritual kind. Picking up on a different ‘connection’ every week, the series will follow all sorts of relationships as they grow and transform. It could be a conflict between father and son; the ever-changing relationship between a husband and wife; the dynamics of sibling rivalry in a brother/sister relationship; the relationship between a character’s past, present and future or how a man’s love for God can reach extreme fanaticism. The series looks at the nature of human relationships from many different perspectives. And makes us realize that whatever the connection, no matter how deep or superficial, it will always leave an impact on our lives and inevitably make us who we are.

In Talkhiyan the opening theme "Mujh se ab meri mohabbat ke fasaaney na kaho", was based on a Sahir Ludhianvi's poem and serial itself was named after Sahir Ludhianavi's Book, Talkhiyan. Bee Gul won a LUX Style Award (2019) for Best TV Writer for Dar Si Jaati Hai Sila, a play that tackled the topic of sexual predators in normal households.

Telefilms
Bee Gul's first script Kaun Qamar Aara was a television film that aired on Hum TV's 2nd telefilms festival, centers on the issues of undivided India and brings to life a tale of a husband and wife during this time. This one-hour short story featured Pakistani actor Shakeel and Faiza Hassan. Kaun Qamar Ara was the only film that was nominated in every category at 2nd Hum Telefilm Awards.
Gul received Best Telefilm Writer Award for Kaun Qamar Ara.

Filmography

As screenwriter

Television

Plays
 Naql-e-Makani, Badshahat Ka Khatima (A theatrical rendition of a short story by Manto and a play written by Rajinder Singh Bedi, both presented at NAPA auditorium. Dir. by Khalid Ahmed, 2013)  
 Bedroom Conversations (2019), presented at NAPA auditorium. Dir. by Khalid Ahmed, 2019.
 Kal Agar Main Marjaoun, Vasl productions. Dir. by Khalid Ahmed, 2021.

Accolades

See also

 List of Pakistani writers
 List of Urdu language writers

References

Pakistani screenwriters
Living people
Writers from Lahore
Pakistani dramatists and playwrights
Pakistani television writers
Year of birth missing (living people)